SM UB-121 was a German Type UB III submarine or U-boat in the German Imperial Navy during World War I. She was commissioned into the German Imperial Navy on 10 February 1918 as SM UB-121.

UB-121 was surrendered to the Allies at Harwich on 20 November 1918 in accordance with the requirements of the Armistice with Germany. She was transferred to France in 1919, but while in tow to Brest in company with  she ran aground at Birling Gap on 15 April 1919. The wreck was sold by the British Admiralty to R. Longmate for £500 on 3 May 1919, and broken up in situ, although a few pieces remain in situ.

Construction

She was built by AG Weser of Bremen and following just under a year of construction, launched at Bremen on 6 January 1918. UB-121 was commissioned later the same year under the command of Oblt.z.S. Albrecht Schmidt. Like all Type UB III submarines, UB-121 carried 10 torpedoes and was armed with a  deck gun. UB-121 had a displacement of  while surfaced and  when submerged. Her engines enabled her to travel at  when surfaced and  when submerged.

References

Notes

Citations

Bibliography 

 

German Type UB III submarines
World War I submarines of Germany
U-boats commissioned in 1918
1918 ships
Ships built in Bremen (state)